Alpha Gamma Sigma, commonly known as Ag Sig or AGS is a national social and professional agricultural fraternity that exists on eight campuses. The mission statement of Alpha Gamma Sigma is "Preparing men for life by: coming together as scholars, living as brothers, becoming leaders of tomorrow."

History

1923
The agricultural fraternity, Alpha Gamma Sigma (AGS), was first organized as a local fraternity at University of Missouri, on January 28, 1923. It was the outgrowth of a feeling among certain men that the other agricultural fraternities were disregarding the type of men essential to the proper forwarding of agriculture.

During the organization and growing period of Alpha Gamma Sigma, a similar organization was going through a period of development at Ohio State University. This organization was known as the National Agriculture Club. It was established October 23, 1922. During its first year its name was changed to Tau Gamma Phi fraternity.

Tau Gamma Phi rapidly grew into prominence in Ohio State campus affairs, and ranked high in scholarship. It maintained as its ideals the advancement of agriculture, scholarship, athletics and the social development of its members.

1931
Unknown to each other, Alpha Gamma Sigma at Columbia, Missouri, and Tau Gamma Phi at Columbus, Ohio, grew to be among the strongest fraternities on their respective campuses. Each had opportunities to affiliate with national fraternities but the members of these two chapters believed that their ideals were high enough to form the foundation of a new and unique organization. In March, 1931, members and alumni of Tau Gamma Phi met with members of Alpha Gamma Sigma at Columbia, and worked out a plan for joining the two groups in what now constitutes the National Chapter. A constitution was drawn up and officers consisted of the following: Clair E. Jones, president; Wayne Johnson, vice president; Don Rush, treasurer, O. E. Allen, secretary; and Delmer Glenn, historian, the Ohio chapter was designated as the Alpha chapter and the Missouri chapter as the Beta chapter.

The second General Convention was held in Columbus, Ohio, November 28 and 29, 1931. The constitution and by-laws were revised and adopted. The fraternity pin and pledge pin were also adopted. A new fraternity crest was designated and put into use. The ritual, secret grip, password, raps, and motto were adopted. Royal blue and silver were selected as the fraternity colors and the red rose as the fraternity flower. A committee was appointed to have a composer write a fraternity, sweetheart, and pledge song.

1951
At the Tenth National Convention in November 1951, procedures were approved for expansion of the fraternity. Possibilities for new chapters at recognized Land-Grant Colleges were reviewed.

1953
November 7, 1953, marked another memorable occasion in the history of AGS with the initiation of the charter members of Gamma chapter. The first step in the organization of Gamma chapter was taken when Assistant Dan Hixon of the University of Nebraska at Lincoln, College of Agriculture was contacted by members of Beta chapter. Dean Hixon in turn approached the members of the Ag. Men's Club, an independent group of agriculture students at the University of Nebraska. The members of the Ag. Men's Club then asked Professor Donald R. Warner, an alumnus of the Beta chapter for additional information and advice. Professor Warner served as an advisor during the entire period of colonization. On March 14, 1953, a delegation from the Beta chapter met with the interested men at Nebraska to discuss plans for colonization. The Gamma Club of AGS was established on April 20, 1953. On November 7, 1953, the Gamma Club became an active chapter, The Gamma Chapter of AGS.

1961
The year 1961 was marked as another growth year for AGS. On Saturday, May 20 a delegation of eight men from Alpha chapter, and six men from Beta chapter plus Grand President Emil Malinovsky and Grand Vice President Alfred Lehmkuhi, initiated 19 charter members into Delta chapter of Alpha Gamma Sigma, located on the campus of Tennessee Technological University at Cookeville, Tennessee. Dr. E. B. Knight served as advisor during the period of colonization and is now an active member of AGS. The founding of Delta chapter was the first chapter below the Mason–Dixon line.

1970
Sixteen men were initiated into the Epsilon chapter of Alpha Gamma Sigma on February 16, 1970. Through the work of two Beta alumni, Colin Collins and Van Ricketts, men at Southwest Missouri State University, Springfield, Missouri, were contacted and colonized by September 15, 1969. Ricketts remained in the capacity of advisor.

The Zeta chapter of AGS was colonized officially October 1, 1970, at Western Illinois University, Macomb, Illinois. On April 3, 1971, during an off-year conclave, members of the other chapters met at Macomb to formally initiate 21 men into active membership as Zeta chapter. Also initiated was Gerry Posler, faculty member who served with Jack Riley, a Beta alumnus, as advisor to the new chapter.

1971
Shortly after the initiation of Zeta chapter, Alpha Gamma Sigma was unanimously accepted as a member of the National Interfraternity Conference on June 19, 1971.

1981
In January, 1981 all present members of the IlliDell Cooperative Fraternity at the University of Illinois voted to become a member of ΑΓΣ. The decision to join a national organization came after the membership was assured that its place in the Fraternity would not hide the previous hard work and cooperation by the local chapter that preceded it and that it would be known as the IlliDell chapter.

1999
The colony at Arkansas Tech University was the result of more than two years of coordinated effort between the national officers and staff members, other ΑΓΣ chapters and students of Arkansas Tech to ensure the success of the chapter. On November 20, 1999, 17 men were initiated as the charter class of the Iota chapter.

2016
Beta chapter completed construction of their new house at the University of Missouri.

2021
Gamma chapter at the University of Nebraska-Lincoln completed their new 32,000 sq/ft house at 3445 Holdrege St. Thanks to over 2.8 million dollars in fundraising from generous Alumni, this house is now the largest Fraternity at the University.

General information
National Headquarters: Columbus, Ohio

Membership: 
Active chapters: 8. 
Total number of initiates: 4,350.

Chapter roll:
1922 Alpha, Ohio State University
1923 Beta, University of Missouri
1953 Gamma, University of Nebraska at Lincoln
1961 Delta, Tennessee Technological University
1970 Epsilon, Missouri State University
1971 Zeta, Western Illinois University
1981 IlliDell, University of Illinois Urbana-Champaign
1999 Iota, Arkansas Tech University

See also

 Professional fraternities and sororities

References

North American Interfraternity Conference
Student organizations established in 1923
1923 establishments in Missouri